Vladimir Durković (Serbian Cyrillic: Владимир Дурковић; 6 November 1937 – 22 June 1972) was a Serbian football defender. He was part of the Yugoslav squad that won gold at the 1960 Summer Olympics.

Career

Club career
Durković played with Red Star Belgrade until he was 28 at which point he moved abroad and made a name for himself with AS Saint-Étienne, winning three French League titles and the Coupe de France twice.

International career
Capped 50 times by Yugoslavia between 1959 and 1966, Durković excelled as a 22-year-old at the first UEFA European Championship, offering defensive solidity and attacking penetration at right-back. Although Yugoslavia finished second in France, Durković won a gold medal at the Rome Olympics the following September. He also wore the number two shirt at the 1962 FIFA World Cup in Chile and was an ever-present as Yugoslavia eliminated former winners Uruguay and West Germany and finished fourth.

Death
He died when mistakenly shot by a policeman in Sion, Switzerland in June 1972 at the age of 34.

Honours 
Red Star Belgrade
 Yugoslav First League: 1955–56, 1956–57, 1958–59, 1959–60, 1963–64
 Yugoslav Cup: 1957–58, 1958–59, 1963–64
 Mitropa Cup: 1958

AS Saint-Etienne
 Ligue 1: 1967–68, 1968–69, 1969–70
 Coupe de France: 1967–68, 1969–70

Yugoslavia
 UEFA European Championship: runner-up 1960
 Olympic gold medalist in 1960

Individual
UEFA European Championship Team of the Tournament: 1960

References

External links
 

1937 births
1972 deaths
Sportspeople from Gjakova
Kosovo Serbs
Yugoslav footballers
Yugoslav expatriate footballers
Yugoslavia international footballers
Serbian footballers
Association football defenders
FK Napredak Kruševac players
Red Star Belgrade footballers
Borussia Mönchengladbach players
AS Saint-Étienne players
FC Sion players
Yugoslav First League players
Ligue 1 players
Bundesliga players
Serbian expatriate footballers
Deaths by firearm in Switzerland
Expatriate footballers in France
Expatriate footballers in West Germany
Expatriate footballers in Germany
Expatriate footballers in Switzerland
Olympic footballers of Yugoslavia
Olympic gold medalists for Yugoslavia
Footballers at the 1960 Summer Olympics
1960 European Nations' Cup players
1962 FIFA World Cup players
Olympic medalists in football
Medalists at the 1960 Summer Olympics
Serbian people murdered abroad